Ratnadeep Gopal Adivrerkar (born 13 November 1974, in Mumbai) is a contemporary artist from India. He has had several important solo exhibitions including one at NUS Museum, Singapore, Galerie Sylvia Bernhardt, Germany and Pavillon du Centanarie/Arcelor Mittal, Luxembourg. In 2013, Ratnadeep exhibited at the prestigious Deutsche Oper Berlin a series of works titled 'The Golden Ear- A Tribute to Wagner', based on German Composer Richard Wagner and mainly his epic opera "Der Ring des Nibelungen" (Ring of Nibelungs). The work revolves around Ratnadeep's philosophical interpretation with connection to especially to Indo-Global mythological context with contemporary times. He has participated in many group exhibitions like 'Sarang', Seoul, Korea; Pictures of Asia, Larasati, Singapore; 'Indian contemporary art', Chelsea College of Arts, UK; Uneo Royal Museum, Japan; Ao~rta Project, BBK Kunst Forum, Düsseldorf and Ausstellungshalle Innenhafen, Duisburg, Germany. He has received a number of awards and scholarships. Ratnadeep lives and works in Mumbai, India and Berlin, Germany.

Early life and education
Ratnadeep Adivrekar was born in 1974 in Mumbai, India. He is the son of artist Gopal S. Adivrekar. He received his Bachelor of Fine Arts in painting with first class in 1997 from one of the oldest and renowned institute in Mumbai   Sir Jamsetjee Jeejebhoy School of Art.

About work 
Ratnadeep Gopal Adivrekar is an artist whose work defies easy definitions, having experimented with a wide range of styles and subject matter, bringing together metaphors from contradictory or unpredicted sources, both historical and contemporary, by using diverse materials and techniques. In fact Ratnadeep's artistic multiplicity, and his resistance to any form of categorisation, can be seen as the consistent theme in his work. The parts of painting have naturalist approximate based on photographic documentations. When a photograph is painted on canvas, the sense of realness in the images are complicated, while they may retain a high degree of verisimilitude, the loss of its mechanical tie to a specific situation. While our eyes perceive these paintings as photography, conceptually we know they are individual interpretations. Ratnadeep has rejected mechanical processes, preferring to explore the visual effects of mechanical technology by hand. Ratnadeep's paintings have usually used techniques which are both time-consuming and physically demanding. Buried within this elaborate surface sometimes are sheets of manipulated expressive color drips transparent enough and mark making, bringing out the rawness of improvisation. In Ratnadeep's works the original source or elements from photographic motifs are patched together in new constellations of allegories thus the paintings have a sort of leaping structure of narratives within narratives. Ratnadeep creates works that have an open-ended narrative and evoke the idea of exploring eternal subjects like existence, death, understanding different facets of philosophy. His work refers directly to the enigma of metamorphosis and his imagery whispers to the subconscious coaxing it to the surface. Making us aware of Ratnadeep's beliefs, the richness of his symbolism but yet mysterious eluding the logically understandable things and combine to make new resonances. He plays with the associational nature of thinking and how often a deliberate act of misunderstanding that can become poetry on canvas. Crowd scenes have become a constant feature in his work in recent years, the systematic-chaos or chaotic-system of crowds from processions and rallies to battles and concerts. The high-octane energy and movement of large gatherings is a reminder, perhaps, of the potential of the crowd or organised mass.

Ratnadeep's desire to see everything at once is apparent in many of his paintings, perhaps most overtly in the overlay of one image on top of others, as if it were possible not just to see through a particular image but to hold them both in a sort of suspension. In these superimposed, suspended and translucent images the structure of narratives is overt. Each of the images is both there and not-there, as the eye is drawn from one to the other. Ratnadeep's works invite the spectator to consider. His task is to reintroduce their significance into a tension with form – but without allowing the images he uses to fall into utter nostalgia. His work is to help the spectator re-evaluate the power of the static image, its ability to make reference to our histories and its power to reinvoke our thoughts and our participation through small acts of attention.
6From Proverbial In(ter)vention Catalogue 2009

Quotes
"Born in family of artists, I have a miniscule [sic] gap between art and life. My works are evidence of exploration, a commentary on art, contemporary life by combining images and forms to construct on human reality. Our socio-politically fragmented society is saturated with opulence of images, which signify ideas of radical modernist utopia. As an archivist of the new world, processing these images and forms has its origin based in experiences, which leads to the relationship between our sense of philosophies, self and world. I'm interested in how meaning is created. My paintings deal with subjects that carry a historical set of references, but collective memory is constantly challenged by enigmatic prophetic actions, concealed in personal folds of the temporal linearity…I believe I am an observer from distant at humanity with deliberation to miniscule [sic] details." – Ratnadeep Gopal Adivrekar

Exhibitions

Solo exhibitions
2017 – '8 Stories', Galerie Mukadam, Berlin, Germany
2014 – 'Parallax Views', Tao Art Gallery, Mumbai
2013 – 'The Golden Ear- A Tribute to Wagner', Seminarhaus Bayreuth, Deutsche Oper, Berlin & Kameha, Frankfurt
2013 – 'Infinite Range of Responses to Time', Galerie Sogan & Art, Singapore
2011 – Discourse of prismatic truths at Pavillon du Centanarie/Arcelor Mittal, Luxembourg.
2010 – Allegories of talking road at Galerie Sylvia Bernhardt, Germany.
2010 – Crimson Art Gallery, Bangalore.
2009 – Proverbial In(ter)vention, NUS Museum, Singapore.
2004 – Refraction of ideas, Artists Centre, Mumbai.
2000 – Souvenirs from journeys within solo exhibition at Kala Academy, Panaji.
1999 – Exhibition at Jehangir Art Gallery, Mumbai.
1998 – Memoirs of the unreal city and findings through journeys. Chavan Art Gallery, Mumbai.

Awards
2017 – 'MVUVM Award' for Achievement in Field of Art.
2003 – The Harmony Emerging Artist Award presented by the Reliance Art Foundation.
2002 – The Bendre Husain Scholarship.
2002 – Maharashtra State Art Award, Jehangir Art Gallery, Mumbai.
2001 – National Scholarship by Lalit Kala Akademi, New Delhi.
1999 – The Governors Prize at the Exhibition of The Bombay Art Society.
1996 – Best Painting Award at The Art Society of India Exhibition.
1994,96 – Merit Certificate the Exhibition of The Bombay Art Society.

Notes

References

Sarang, celebration of India's cultural wonders in Korea

External links 
Official site
Images of work at The Arts Trust

20th-century Indian painters
1974 births
Living people
Indian contemporary painters
Artists from Mumbai
Painters from Maharashtra